Slyudyanka is a rural locality (a selo) in Mikhaylovsky Selsoviet, Ust-Kalmansky District, Altai Krai, Russia. The population was 117 as of 2013. There are 2 streets.

Geography 
Slyudyanka is located 47 km southeast of Ust-Kalmanka (the district's administrative centre) by road. Ogni is the nearest rural locality.

References 

Rural localities in Ust-Kalmansky District